This list is a compilation of contract bridge players, writers, administrators and personalities who have been recognized for their skills, achievements or contributions to the game as identified by various specific sources.

People recognized by bridge organizations

American Contract Bridge League

Hall of Fame

The first bridge Hall of Fame was inaugurated by The Bridge World in 1964 and invested nine members between then and 1966 after which it ceased sponsorship. The American Contract Bridge League adopted the concept to recognize the achievements and contributions of those residing in its territory (USA, Canada, Mexico and Bermuda) and inaugurated its own Hall of Fame in 1995 by accepting the original nine and adding eight others that year. Annually thereafter, new members have been added in as many as three award categories.
 Open Award – "living individuals who have achieved prominence in the game of bridge and have an outstanding tournament record"
 von Zedtwitz Award – "living or deceased individuals who have achieved prominence in the game of bridge and have an outstanding tournament record but who may not have been in the limelight for a significant period of time" (20 people in 19 years to 2014)
 Blackwood Award – "individuals who have contributed greatly to the game of bridge without necessarily being world class players" (19 people to 2014)

In 2008, ACBL established the Foundation for the Preservation and Advancement of Bridge (FPAB) "to support the preservation of bridge history, to recognize individuals for their excellence and service to the game of bridge and to inspire the participation of youth through scholarships and grants."

Most influential personalities

In 2012, the American Contract Bridge League celebrated the 75th anniversary of its creation by the merger of the American Bridge League and the United States Bridge Association in October 1937. In partial recognition, the League published a list of the 52 most influential personalities during its history.

Criteria included:
 contributions to bidding theory that have stood the test of time;
 contributions to bridge literature of enduring importance;
 contributions to law, regulation or administration making bridge more accessible or more fun;
 charisma that has broadened the appeal of bridge to non-players.
Selections were not limited to ACBL members or North American residents.

Player of the Year
 The Player of the Year is awarded to the ACBL player accumulating the most platinum masterpoints in the calendar year.

Canadian Bridge Federation – Hall of Fame

The Canadian Bridge Federation (CBF) is the national bridge organization for Canada and established the CBF Hall of Fame in 2010 to recognize the achievements and contributions of Canadian bridge personalities.

European Bridge League – Awards and Distinctions
The European Bridge League (EBL) is a confederation of national bridge organizations for European countries, established 1947.
 Honorary Titles
 Plaques
 Medals. Since 1975, the EBL recognizes distinguished bridge people.

World Bridge Federation – Awards and Distinctions
The World Bridge Federation (WBF) is the world governing body for bridge, established in 1958.
 Women Stars  
 WBF Master Point Records including titles such as "World Grand Master" (directory; some lists maintained infrequently or not at all)
 Medals (to 2006)
 Hall of Fame  (inactive) 
 Plaques & Trophies (to 2006)
 Youth Awards (to 2006)

People recognized in bridge books

Numerous biographical entries are contained in the Encyclopedia of Bridge (1935), the various editions of The Official Encyclopedia of Bridge (1964–2011), The Bridge Players' Encyclopedia (1967), and in the British Bridge Almanack (2004).

In addition, the following books provide biographical information about bridge people as of the date of publication.

Aces All by Guy Ramsey (1955)
In the foreword of Aces All, Ramsey writes that "it is a book about some, though by no means all, of the leading players of today and the immediate yesterday..." He presents biographies of the following (all either British or playing in Britain):

 Leslie Dodds
 Harold Franklin
 Nico Gardener
 Maurice Harrison-Gray

 Ewart Kempson
 Kenneth Konstam
 Richard Lederer
 Iain Macleod

 Rixi Markus
 J. C. H. Marx
 Adam Meredith
 Terence Reese

 Boris Schapiro
 Jim Sharples
 Bob Sharples
 S. J. (Skid) Simon

 Dr. Paul Stern
 Joel Tarlo
 Louis Tarlo

The Bridge Immortals by Victor Mollo (1968)
The Bridge Immortals gives brief biographies of the "greatest bridge people living today", listed here in alphabetical order.

Walter Avarelli
B. Jay Becker
Giorgio Belladonna
David Berah
Jean Besse
Massimo D'Alelio
Claude Deruy
Leslie Dodds

Pietro Forquet
Richard L. Frey
Nico Gardener
Benito Garozzo
Fritzi Gordon
Maurice Harrison-Gray
Dorothy Hayden

Oswald Jacoby
Pierre Jaïs
Edgar Kaplan
Norman Kay
Theodore Lightner
Paul Lukacs
Rixi Markus

Adam Meredith
Rafael Munoz
Camillo Pabis Ticci
Carl'Alberto Perroux
Terence Reese
Alvin Roth
Boris Schapiro

Howard Schenken
Cornelis Slavenburg
Sam Stayman
Roger Trézel
Alan Truscott
Egmont von Dewitz
Einar Werner

World Class by Marc Smith (1999)
World Class: conversations with the bridge masters features "the crème de la crème of the world of bridge" in their own words. Here is Smith's classification of his interviews.

All-time Greats:
John Collings
Benito Garozzo
Bob Hamman
Per Olof Sundelin
Dorothy Hayden Truscott

Stars of Today:
Gabriel Chagas
Geir Helgemo
Apolinary Kowalski
Magnus Lindkvist
Zia Mahmood
Jeff Meckstroth
Andrew Robson
Alfredo Versace

Women Stars:
Sabine Auken
Maria Erhart
Karen McCallum
Nicola Smith

Rising Stars:
Boye Brogeland
Fred Gitelman
Jason Hackett and Justin Hackett
Morten Lund Madsen

Star Writers:
Larry N. Cohen
Eddie Kantar
Ron Klinger
Mike Lawrence

British Bridge Almanack by Peter Hasenson (2004)
The Editor's Choice nominations are listed alphabetically as follows:

20 Greatest Players of All Time
B. Jay Becker
Giorgio Belladonna
Norberto Bocchi
Gabriel Chagas
Billy Eisenberg
Pietro Forquet
Benito Garozzo
Bob Hamman
Maurice Harrison-Gray
Geir Helgemo
Oswald Jacoby
Zia Mahmood
Jeff Meckstroth
Terence Reese
Eric Rodwell
Michael Rosenberg
Howard Schenken
Tim Seres
Paul Soloway
Bobby Wolff

19 Greatest Partnerships of the last 30 Years
Cezary Balicki & Adam Żmudziński
Giorgio Belladonna & Benito Garozzo
Norberto Bocchi & Giorgio Duboin
Marcelo Branco & Gabriel Chagas
Paul Chemla & Michel Perron
Tony Forrester & Andrew Robson
Piotr Gawryś & Marcin Leśniewski
Bobby Goldman & Paul Soloway
Bob Hamman & Bobby Wolff
Geir Helgemo & Tor Helness
Eddie Kantar & Mike Lawrence
Sami Kehela & Eric Murray
Lorenzo Lauria & Alfredo Versace
Alain Levy & Christian Mari
Zia Mahmood & Michael Rosenberg
Chip Martel & Lew Stansby
Krzysztof Martens & Marek Szymanowski
Jeff Meckstroth & Eric Rodwell
Alan Sontag & Peter Weichsel

16 Greatest Female Partnerships of All Time
Carla Arnolds & Bep Vriend
Daniela von Arnim & Sabine Auken 
Véronique Bessis & Catherine D'Ovidio 
Marisa Bianchi & Anna Valenti
Mildred Breed & Shawn Quinn
Sally Brock & Sandra Landy 
Bénédicte Cronier & Sylvie Willard
Pat Davies & Nicola Smith 
Lynn Deas & Beth Palmer
Joan Durran & Jane Priday 
Maria Erhart & Doris Fischer
Fritzi Gordon & Rixi Markus 
Emma Jean Hawes & Dorothy Hayden Truscott 
Karen McCallum & Kerri Sanborn 
Jacqui Mitchell & Gail Moss Greenberg 
Judi Radin & Kathie Wei 

Greatest Player Ever:
Bob Hamman

Greatest Authors:
Mike Lawrence
Terence Reese

Simply the Best - 20 of the Greatest Bridge Players of all Time  by Brian Senior (2015)
In this seventy-page booklet, Senior provides commentary about twenty individuals he regards as the best bridge players or personalities of all time.

 Harold Vanderbilt
 Ely Culbertson
 P. Hal Sims
 Howard Schenken
 B. Jay Becker
 Charles Goren
 Helen Sobel

 Terence Reese
 Rixi Markus
 Giorgio Belladonna
 Pietro Forquet
 Benito Garozzo
 Omar Sharif
 Edgar Kaplan

 Bob Hamman
 Mike Lawrence
 George Rosenkranz
 Zia Mahmood
 Jeff Meckstroth
 Geir Helgemo

Point leaders

American Contract Bridge League

Grand Life Masters (GLM) defined by lifetime ACBL master points (MP), with some condition on major achievements
 MP leaders all-time, including deceased members, GLM only

Players of the Decade – defined by ACBL platinum master points
 1990s
 2000s 
 2010s – Leaders, 2010 to present

European Bridge League
Lists of the top European Master Points (EMP) holders in various categories and for various periods

World Bridge Federation
The World Bridge Federation measures achievement in tournament play by a dual system of Master Points and Placing Points
and provides ranked lists in Open, Women, and Seniors categories.
Short colloquialisms like "Fulvio Fantoni is number one in the world" refer to the WBF Open Ranking. It ranks by Master Points those all-time players whose Placing Points accord "World Grand Master" status. MPs decay but PPs do not, so retired and deceased World Grand Masters remain on the list but drift toward the bottom.

Other listings

Video interviews
The American Contract Bridge League has published at YouTube audio-video interviews of numerous players including almost 30 members of its Hall of Fame. These listings include some other videos of bridge personalities published at YouTube. (Those marked "ACBL Hall of Fame" may be interviews conducted by Audrey Grant, as are the ones so marked.)

Mike Becker ACBL Hall of Fame
David Berkowitz ACBL Hall of Fame
David Berkowitz accepting Hall of Fame induction
Boye Brogeland interviewed by John Carruthers
John Carruthers interviewed by Bridge Kids
Gabriel Chagas and Zia Mahmood explaining online money-bridge
Larry Cohen presenting Berkowitz for Hall of Fame induction
Larry Cohen and Jeff Meckstroth talking bridge on a cruise
Joshua Donn and Roger Lee interviewed by Bridge Winners after Blue Ribbon 2011 victory
Billy Eisenberg ACBL Hall of Fame
Billy Eisenberg interviewed by Audrey Grant
Henry Francis ACBL Hall of Fame
Benito Garozzo interviewed by Audrey Grant
Fred Gitelman interviewed by Bridge Kids
Bobby Goldman ACBL Hall of Fame
Joe Grue interviewed by Gavin Wolpert

Fred Hamilton ACBL Hall of Fame
Bob Hamman interviewed by Audrey Grant
Bob Hamman ACBL Hall of Fame
Bob Hamman interviewed by Bridge Kids
Eddie Kantar interviewed by Audrey Grant
Eddie Kantar ACBL Hall of Fame
Edgar Kaplan ACBL Hall of Fame
Sami Kehela ACBL Hall of Fame
Betty Ann Kennedy ACBL Hall of Fame
 Eric Kokish ACBL Hall of Fame
Mark Lair ACBL Hall of Fame
Sidney Lazard ACBL Hall of Fame
Bobby Levin interviewed by Audrey Grant
Bobby Levin interviewed by Bridge Topics
Zia Mahmood interviewed by Audrey Grant
Zia Mahmood ACBL Hall of Fame
Jan Martel ACBL Hall of Fame

Jeff Meckstroth interviewed by Audrey Grant
Jeff Meckstroth interviewed by Bridge Kids
Jeff Meckstroth interviewed by Bridge Topics
Mark Molson interviewed by Audrey Grant
Eric Murray ACBL Hall of Fame
Aileen Osofsky ACBL Hall of Fame
Mike Passell ACBL Hall of Fame
George Rapée ACBL Hall of Fame
Barry Rigal interviewed by John Carruthers
Eric Rodwell interviewed by Mark Horton 1
Eric Rodwell interviewed by Mark Horton 2
Steve Robinson ACBL Hall of Fame
 Carol Sanders ACBL Hall of Fame
Kerri Sanborn ACBL Hall of Fame
 Alfred Sheinwold ACBL Hall of Fame
Alan Sontag ACBL Hall of Fame
Katherine Wei-Sender ACBL Hall of Fame
Peter Weichsel ACBL Hall of Fame

Bridge in fiction

James Bond
 M in James Bond (Miles Messervy)
The first James Bond film Dr. No (film) features bridge.
 The characters played by Chico Marx and Harpo Marx, in the 1930 film Animal Crackers.

 Hercule Poirot
 Norma Desmond
 Snoopy and Woodstock

 Lily Bart, in Edith Wharton's 1905 novel The House of Mirth
 E.F. Benson's Mapp and Lucia novels (1920–1939) feature bridge.
 Meteor Garden features bridge.
The movie Sunset Boulevard features bridge

Famous people and bridge

 Warren Buffett
 George Burns
 Winston Churchill
 Deng Xiaoping
 Dwight Eisenhower
 Gandhi (Mohandas Karamchand Gandhi)
Bill Gates
 George S. Kaufman
Buster Keaton
Chico Marx
 W. Somerset Maugham
 Lauritz Melchior
 Martina Navratilova
 Charles M. Schulz
Omar Sharif
Margaret Thatcher
 Everton Weekes
 John Paul Stevens
 Harold E. Talbott
 Fred M. Vinson
 Wan Li
 H. H. Asquith
 F. W. de Klerk
 Pervez Musharraf
 Janusz Korwin-Mikke
 John H. Caldwell (American Nordic skier)
 Forest Evashevski
James Holzhauer

See also
 List of bridge books
 List of bridge magazines
 List of bridge competitions and awards

People with Wikipedia articles

A
 Terje Aa
 Pierre Albarran
 Karen Allison
 Leslie Amoils
 Ron Andersen
 Martin Andresen
 Jay Apfelbaum
 Russ Arnold
 Sabine Auken
 Walter Avarelli
B
 Lynn Baker
 Cezary Balicki
 Boris Baran
 Hermine Baron
 Roger Bates
 Grant Baze
 Henry Beasley
 B. Jay Becker
 Mike Becker
 Giorgio Belladonna
 Richard Belton
 Albert Benjamin
 Marty Bergen
 David Berkowitz
 Lisa Berkowitz
 Huub Bertens
 Peter Bertheau
 Thomas Bessis
 Dennis Bilde
 David Bird
 Cheri Bjerkan
 Easley Blackwood Sr.
 Lou Bluhm
 Norberto Bocchi
 Janet de Botton
 Tim Bourke
 Peter Boyd
 Malcolm Brachman
 Bart Bramley
 Marcelo Branco
 Mildred Breed
 Tomas Brenning
 Sjoert Brink
 Raymond Brock
 Boye Brogeland
 John Brown
 David Bruce 
 Michelle Brunner
 Walter Buller
 Krzysztof Buras
 Chuck Burger
 Ann Burnstein
 David Burnstine
 Wesley Burrowes
C
 Orlando Campos
 Mike Cappelletti
 Gerald Caravelli
 David Carter

 Drew Casen
 James Cayne
 Gabriel Chagas
 Juanita Chambers
 Bernie Chazen
 Curtis Cheek
 Paul Chemla
 Dennis Clerkin
 George Coffin
 Larry N. Cohen
 Larry T. Cohen
 Ben Cohen
 Gary Cohler
 Richard Coren
 Chris Compton
 Donna Compton
 Charles Coon
 Kitty Cooper
 Barry Crane
 Carol Crawford
 John R. Crawford
 Bénédicte Cronier
 Ely Culbertson
 Josephine Culbertson
D
 Massimo D'Alelio
 Hugh Darwen
 Lynn Deas
 Ishmael Delmonte
 Richard DeMartino
 Nikolay Demirev
 Seymon Deutsch
 Mike Develin
 John Diamond
 Leslie Dodds
 Joshua Donn
 Albert Dormer
 Doug Doub
 Bas Drijver
 Giorgio Duboin
 Michel Duguet
E
 Joan Eaton
 Bill Edelstein
 Billy Eisenberg
 Russ Ekeblad
 Waleed El Ahmady
 Morrie Elis
 Milton Ellenby
 J.B. Elwell
 Maria Erhart
 Bob Etter
 Disa Eythorsdottir
F
 Ben Fain
 Allan Falk
 Björn Fallenius
 Fulvio Fantoni
 Mary Jane Farell
 Phil Feldesman
 Harry Fishbein

 Arnie Fisher
 Lotan Fisher
 William Flannery
 Marty Fleisher
 Jeremy Flint
 Pietro Forquet
 Tony Forrester
 R.F. Foster
 Gene Freed
 Richard Freeman
 Edith Freilich
 Richard L. Frey
 Doris Fuller
G
 Nico Gardener
 Steve Garner
 Benito Garozzo
 Piotr Gawryś
 Terry W. Gee
 Ron Gerard
 John Gerber
 Pierre Ghestem
 Eldad Ginossar
 Fred Gitelman
 Jeff Glick
 Brian Glubok
 Ramesh Gokhale
 Bobby Goldman
 Arthur S. Goldsmith
 Gratian Goldstein
 Agnes Gordon
 Fritzi Gordon
 Phil Gordon
 Charles Goren
 Michael T. Gottlieb
 Larry Gould
 Ross Grabel
 Matt Granovetter
 Audrey Grant
 Allan Graves
 Eric Greco
 Alan C. Greenberg
 Ari Greenberg
 Gail Greenberg
 William Grieve
 Andrew Gromov
 Susanna Gross
 Glenn Grøtheim
 Joe Grue
 Nancy Gruver
 Ace Gutowsky
H
 Garey Hayden
 Fred Hamilton
 Bob Hamman
 Petra Hamman
 Nicolas Hammond
 Geoff Hampson
 Harold Harkavy
 Maurice Harrison-Gray
 Emma Jean Hawes
 Lee Hazen

 Geir Helgemo
 Tor Helness
 Christal Henner
 Walter Herbert
 Paul Hodge
 Marc Hodler
 Martin Hoffman
 Mark Horton
 John W. Hubbell
 Carl Hudecek
 Roy Hughes
 Edward Hymes
I
J
 Zeke Jabbour
 George Jacobs
 Marc Jacobus
 Oswald Jacoby
 Pierre Jaïs
 Krzysztof Jassem
 Marilyn Johnson
 Henry Jones (Cavendish)
 Robert F. Jordan
 Patrick Jourdain
K
 Charles Kalme
 Mike Kamil
 Edwin Kantar
 Edgar Kaplan
 Fred Kaplan
 Peggy Kaplan
 Kalin Karaivanov
 Gaylor Kasle
 Ralph Katz
 Richard H. Katz
 George S. Kaufman
 Norman Kay
 Amalya Lyle Kearse
 Sami Kehela
 Hugh Kelsey
 Alicia Kempner
 Betty Ann Kennedy
 Roy Kerr
 Richard Khautin
 Ron Klinger
 Martin de Knijff
 Putte Kock
 Eric Kokish
 Kenneth Konstam
 Daniel Korbel
 Warren Kornfeld
 Valentin Kovachev
 Boris Koytchou
 Jim Krekorian
 Michał Kwiecień
L
 Mark Lair
 Hemant Lall
 Harry Lampert
 Steve Landen
 Alvin Landy
 Sandra Landy
 Kyle Larsen

 Emanuel Lasker
 Lorenzo Lauria
 Mike Lawrence
 Sidney H. Lazard
 Robert Lebi
 Michael Ledeen
 Peter Lee
 Linda Lee
 James Lemon
 Sidney Lenz
 Sam Lev
 Peter Leventritt
 Bobby Levin
 Jill Levin
 Irina Levitina
 Theodore Lightner
 Harold Lilie
 Espen Lindqvist
 Robert Lipsitz
 Clyde E. Love
 Paul Lukacs
 Carolyn Lynch
M
 Iain Macleod
 Christina Lund Madsen
 Jim Mahaffey
 Tom Mahaffey
 Zia Mahmood
 Merwyn Maier
 Renee Mancuso
 Ed Manfield
 Jo Ann Manfield
 Ronald Mansbridge
 Rixi Markus
 Chip Martel
 Jan Martel
 Krzysztof Martens
 Jack Marx
 Lew Mathe
 Karen McCallum
 Pat McDevitt
 Jeff Meckstroth
 Rose Meltzer
 Adam Meredith
 Jill Meyers
 Marion Michielsen
 Marshall Miles
 Jacqui Mitchell
 Victor Mitchell
 Sol Mogal
 John Mohan
 Victor Mollo
 Mark Molson
 Albert H. Morehead
 Larry Mori
 Dan Morse
 Jo Morse
 Brad Moss
 Bauke Muller
 Franck Multon
 Eric Murray
N
 Bobby Nail
 Nick Nickell
 Claudio Nunes

O
 Don Oakie
 Harold Ogust
 Jack Olsen
 Lou Ann O'Rourke
 Jaime Ortiz-Patiño
 Aileen Osofsky
 Géza Ottlik
P
 Camillo Pabis Ticci
 Beth Palmer
 Mike Passell
 Richard Pavlicek
 Jordanis Pavlides
 Peter Pender
 Leonard Pennario
 Carl'Alberto Perroux
 Olive Peterson
 Hubert Phillips
 Sue Picus
 Josef Piekarek
 Brian Platnick
 William Pole
 Rozanne Pollack
 Michael Polowan
 Gary Pomerantz
 Helen Portugal
 Julian Pottage
 Tony Priday
 Ricco van Prooijen
 Tommy Prothro
 Jacek Pszczoła
Q
 Shawn Quinn
R
 Judi Radin
 Pratap Rajadhyaksha
 George Rapée
 Barbara Rappaport
 Stella Rebner
 Terence Reese
 Doris Rhodes
 Kay Rhodes
 Barry Rigal
 Arthur G. Robinson
 Steve Robinson
 Jim Robison
 Andrew Robson
 Eric Rodwell
 Bill Root
 Eunice Rosen
 Billy Rosen
 Debbie Rosenberg
 Michael Rosenberg
 George Rosenkranz
 Hugh Ross
 Alvin Roth
 Dan Rotman
 Jeff Rubens
 Ron Rubin
 Ira Rubin

S
 Tarek Sadek
 Kerri Sanborn
 Carol Sanders
 Thomas K. Sanders
 Boris Schapiro
 Howard Schenken
 John Schermer
 Meyer Schleifer
 Peter Schneider
 Kay Schulle
 Richard Schwartz
 Ron Schwartz
 Barbara Seagram
 Michael Seamon
 William Seamon
 Janice Seamon-Molson
 A. J. Sefi
 Martin Seligman
 Antonio Sementa
 Brian Senior
 Tim Seres
 Omar Sharif
 Alfred Sheinwold
 Shen Chun-shan
 Ruth Sherman
 Jaggy Shivdasani
 Rita Shugart
 Allan Siebert
 Sidney Silodor
 S. J. Simon
 Dorothy Rice Sims
 P. Hal Sims
 Steve Sion
 Alexander Smirnov
 Helen Sobel Smith
 Marc Smith
 Nicola Smith
 Mike Smolen
 Tobi Sokolow
 Paul Soloway
 Charles J. Solomon
 Peggy Solomon
 Alan Sontag
 Nathan B. Spingold
 Ivar Stakgold
 JoAnna Stansby
 Lew Stansby
 Allan Stauber
 Samuel Stayman
 Sherman Stearns
 Paul Stern
 Fred Stewart
 Tobias Stone
 P.O. Sundelin
 John Sutherlin
 Peggy Sutherlin
 John Swanson
 Paul Swanson
 Ralph Swimer
 Peter Swinnerton-Dyer

T
 Edward O. Taylor
 Haig Tchamitch
 Tom Townsend
 Roger Trézel
 Dorothy Hayden Truscott
 Alan Truscott
 Alex Tschekaloff
U
 Helen Utegaard
V
 Harold Stirling Vanderbilt
 Alfredo Versace
 Daniela von Arnim
 Ron Von der Porten
 Waldemar von Zedtwitz
 Bep Vriend
W
 Margaret Wagar
 Rhoda Walsh
 Louis H. Watson
 C. C. Wei
 Katherine Wei-Sender
 Peter Weichsel
 Howard Weinstein
 Steve Weinstein
 Albert Weiss
 Roy Welland
 Valerie Westheimer
 Berry Westra
 Charles Wigoder
 Adam Wildavsky
 Sylvie Willard
 Chris Willenken
 Eddie Wold
 Bobby Wolff
 Gavin Wolpert
 Jenny Wolpert
 Joel Wooldridge
 Kit Woolsey
 Sally Woolsey
 Milton Work
 Meike Wortel
X Y Z
 Sally Young
 Richard Zeckhauser
 Jack Zhao
 Pierre Zimmermann
 Adam Żmudziński

Notes

References

External links
 Bridge People at the World Bridge Federation website.
 Warren Buffett and Bill Gates playing bridge
 The All Time Bridge Greats on the Claire Bridge website
 Bridge Greats on the Bridge Guys website
 Biographies of the English Bridge Union

People